Kim Gunnar Svendsen (born 24 December 1955) is a Danish former cyclist. He competed in the team pursuit event at the 1976 Summer Olympics.

References

External links
 

1955 births
Living people
Danish male cyclists
Olympic cyclists of Denmark
Cyclists at the 1976 Summer Olympics
People from Roskilde
Sportspeople from Region Zealand